Aretha Franklin (1942–2018) was an American singer, songwriter, and pianist.

Aretha may also refer to:
Aretha Brown (born 2000), Indigenous Australian youth activist
Aretha Thurmond (born 1976), American discus thrower
Aretha (1961 album), an album by Aretha Franklin with the Ray Bryant Combo
Aretha (1980 album), an album by Aretha Franklin
Aretha (1986 album), an album by Aretha Franklin
"Aretha" (song), a song by British singer-songwriter Rumer
Aretha (video game), a role-playing video game released in 1990

See also
Arethas (disambiguation)